The Birmingham Manor House or Birmingham Moat was a moated building that formed the seat of the Lord of the Manor of Birmingham, England during the Middle Ages, remaining the property of the de Birmingham family until 1536. The buildings were demolished and the moat filled-in in 1815–16, but the remains of medieval stone structures excavated in 1973–75 survive intact beneath the buildings of the Birmingham Wholesale Markets.

The date of the first settlement of the site is unknown. Although Birmingham's origins lie in the Anglo-Saxon period and the manor of Birmingham definitely existed at the time of the Domesday Book, no evidence from earlier than the medieval period was found during the archaeological investigations of the site in the 1970s and 2000s. The circular form of the moat suggests eleventh- or twelfth-century origins, and the entrance to the site pointed away from the centre of the medieval town at the site now known as the Bull Ring, suggesting that it preceded the twelfth-century development of the town around the marketplace.

Excavations during the construction of the Birmingham Wholesale Markets between 1973 and 1975 revealed a sandstone wall that included a moulding similar to those found on other sites in the West Midlands such as Sandwell Priory, probably dating it to the twelfth century. This wall had been incorporated into a later structure about 11m long and 4m wide with chamfered ashlar stonework – possibly a tower, an oriel window, the base of a stair or the end of a building – with a buttress that indicates a likely thirteenth century date. Further excavations as part of the redevelopment of the Bull RIng in 2000 showed that the moat was 2.5m deep.

Documentary evidence of the site is slight. The moat may have been associated with the castrum mentioned in the royal charter of 1166 that granted Peter de Birmingham the right to hold a market in Birmingham, though this isn't certain. The site was mentioned again in a survey of Birmingham of c. 1529 that describes the moat and a drawbridge and claims that the buildings were in a ruinous condition. Another sixteenth-century document describes an outer court to the south east of the site. By the time the site was first illustrated in William Westley's 1731 map of Birmingham there appear to have been no medieval buildings remaining apart from a large circular dovecote, and later maps of 1750 and 1778 show four buildings running across the site in a north-south direction. A single illustration of the site survives from 1814, the year before its destruction.

References

Bibliography

History of Birmingham, West Midlands
Houses in Birmingham, West Midlands
Buildings and structures demolished in 1815
Demolished buildings and structures in the West Midlands (county)
Manor houses in England